John William Stephenson (9 January 1883 – 3 April 1963) was an Australian rules footballer who played with Essendon in the Victorian Football League (VFL).

Notes

External links 
		

1883 births
1963 deaths
Australian rules footballers from Victoria (Australia)
Essendon Football Club players
Balmain Australian Football Club players